Just for You is the fourth studio album by American singer Gladys Knight. It was released by MCA Records on September 13, 1994 in the United States. The album was nominated for the Grammy Award for Best R&B Album at the 37th awards ceremony, while	"I Don't Want to Know" earned a nomination in the Best Female R&B Vocal Performance category.

Critical reception

Allmusic editor Alex Henderson found that Just for You "is a decent R&B/pop effort that, although not in a class with Knight's classic Motown and Buddha recordings with the Pips, has more strengths than weaknesses. The singer's voice had held up impressively well over the years, and she uses it advantageously on a superb cover of The Impressions' 1969 classic "Choice of Colors" (clearly the highlight of the CD), as well as such memorable offerings as the gospel-influenced "Guilty" (a commentary on racism and sexism that makes its point without preaching) and the stirring ballad "Home Alone." The CD isn't essential, but it's generally honest, well-executed and satisfying."

Track listing 

Notes
  denotes co-producer

Charts

Weekly charts

Year-end charts

Certifications

Release history

References 

Gladys Knight albums
1994 albums
MCA Records albums